AVIC Aircraft Corporation Ltd. (AVIC Aircraft) is a state-owned enterprise in Xi'an, Shaanxi, China, which manufactures and markets structural parts and components for aircraft and automobiles. It was founded in 1997 by Xi'an Aircraft Industrial Corporation. It was listed on the Shenzhen Stock Exchange the same year.

In 2013 the company was restructured to become AVIC Aircraft.

References

External links

 

Aircraft manufacturers of China
Government-owned companies of China
Defence companies of the People's Republic of China
Manufacturing companies based in Xi'an
Companies established in 1997
Companies listed on the Shenzhen Stock Exchange